Mirza Kadym Irevani was an Azerbaijani ornamentalist artist and portraitist, who mostly created "typical Persian miniatures and lacquers", founder of Azerbaijani panel painting, whose works greatly influenced Azerbaijani visual art of the modern period.

Mirza Kadym Irevani is famous for his drawings and miniature paintings. In the 1850s, he was commissioned by the Russians to repaint the interior of the Erivan Sardar's Palace, which had originally been painted by a Persian artist in 1815. He also painted 4 big (1 м X 2 м) portraits for the Sardar's Palace. Mirza Kadym Erivani's works are kept in the National Art Museum of Azerbaijan, the Art Museum of Georgia, and the Hermitage.

Biography
Mirza Kadym Irevani was born in 1825, in the city of Erivan in Qajar Iran during the tenure of the last Iranian governor of the Erivan Khanate, Hossein Khan Sardar, and belonged to a "family of professional decorators". During Hossein Khan's capable governorship, Erivan prospered; the Sardar's Palace became decorated with mirrors, stuccos, and fourteen paintings. 

The paintings depicted four heroes from the Iranian Shahnameh epic, including Rostam and Sohrab, as well as contemporary Iranian notables; king Fath-Ali Shah Qajar (1797–1834), Abbas Mirza, Hossein Khan Sardar, and his brother Hasan Khan Qajar. Other paintings included two hunting and battle scenes. All fourteen paintings were originally painted in 1815 by a Persian painter named ʿAbd al-Rāziq.

At the decisive siege of Erivan of 1827, during the Russo-Persian War of 1826-1828, the Russian artillery gravely damaged the Sardar's Palace. After the Iranians were forced to cede Erivan to the Russians per the Treaty of Turkmenchay of 1828, the Erivan Sardar's palace was neglected by the Russians, and thus fell in ruins. A few decades later, in 1850, when Orientalism came in vogue, the Russians decided to rebuild the palace. The Russians commissioned Mirza Kadym Irevani to repaint the interior of the palace. Thus; "all historical figures depicted on the walls of the palace were from 30-40 years earlier than the time of Mirza Kadym Irevani". 

Mirza Kadym Irevani's oeuvre consists mostly of "typical Persian miniatures and lacquers". He also created some "monumental and easel paintings with figurative motives", but they are considered to be of lesser aesthetic quality. In relation to his oeuvre, Associate Professor Irina Koshoridze adds: 

Mirza Kadym Irevani's paintings of the Sardar's Palace, as well as "a few of his oil paintings" are kept in the National Art Museum of Azerbaijan. Some of his other works are kept in the Hermitage in St. Petersburg. Five paintings (Rostam, Sohrab, Fath-Ali Shah Qajar, Hossein Khan Sardar, and Hasan Khan Qajar) were moved to Georgia after the Russians demolished the Palace in 1914, and are kept in the Oriental arts department of the Art Museum of Georgia.

Gallery

Notes

References

Sources
 
 
 

Azerbaijani portrait painters
Armenian Azerbaijanis
Artists from Yerevan
Iranian Azerbaijanis
Iranian painters
1825 births
1875 deaths
19th-century Azerbaijani painters